The Roman Catholic Diocese of Maracay is a diocese located in the city of Maracay in the Ecclesiastical province of Valencia en Venezuela in Venezuela.

History
On 21 June 1958 Pope Pius XII established the Diocese of Maracay from the Diocese of Calabozo and Metropolitan Archdiocese of Caracas.

Bishops

Ordinaries
José Alí Lebrún Moratinos † (21 Jun 1958 – 19 Mar 1962); Appointed, Bishop of Valencia, Venezuela; future Cardinal
Feliciano González Ascanio † (31 Jul 1962 – 13 Dec 1986)
José Vicente Henriquez Andueza, S.D.B. † (24 Jun 1987 – 5 Feb 2003)
Reinaldo del Prette Lissot (5 Feb 2003 – 10 Apr 2007) Appointed, Archbishop of Valencia, Venezuela
Rafael Ramón Conde Alfonzo † (12 Feb 2008 – 19 July 2019)
Enrique José Parravano Marino, S.D.B.(19 July 2019 — present)

Coadjutor bishop
Reinaldo del Prette Lissot (1997–2003)

See also
Roman Catholicism in Venezuela

Sources
 GCatholic.org
 Catholic Hierarchy 

Roman Catholic dioceses in Venezuela
Roman Catholic Ecclesiastical Province of Valencia en Venezuela
Christian organizations established in 1958
Roman Catholic dioceses and prelatures established in the 20th century
1958 establishments in Venezuela
Maracay